Michaël Wiggers (born 8 February 1980) is a Belgian former professional footballer who played as a right-back for a number of clubs in Belgium.

References

External links
 
 

1980 births
Living people
Belgian footballers
Association football fullbacks
Standard Liège players
S.V. Zulte Waregem players
R.A.E.C. Mons players
F.C.V. Dender E.H. players
F91 Dudelange players
R.E. Virton players
Belgian expatriate footballers
Belgian expatriate sportspeople in Luxembourg
Expatriate footballers in Luxembourg